The canton of Rostrenen is an administrative division of the Côtes-d'Armor department, northwestern France. Its borders were modified at the French canton reorganisation which came into effect in March 2015. Its seat is in Rostrenen.

It consists of the following communes:
 
Bon Repos sur Blavet
Canihuel
Glomel
Gouarec
Kergrist-Moëlou
Lanrivain
Lescouët-Gouarec
Locarn
Maël-Carhaix
Mellionnec
Le Moustoir
Paule
Peumerit-Quintin
Plélauff
Plévin
Plouguernével
Plounévez-Quintin
Rostrenen
Saint-Connan
Sainte-Tréphine
Saint-Gilles-Pligeaux
Saint-Igeaux
Saint-Nicolas-du-Pélem
Trébrivan
Treffrin
Trémargat
Tréogan

References

Cantons of Côtes-d'Armor